Ichabuckler Creek is a stream in the U.S. state of Georgia.

Ichabuckler is a name derived from the Muskogean language meaning "Tobacco Pipe Creek".

References

Rivers of Georgia (U.S. state)
Rivers of Stewart County, Georgia